Spanish Blue is the second single released by Australian rock group, The Triffids in 1982. The single was produced by Les Karski (The Nauts, Ray Arnott, Midnight Oil) for the White Label Records imprint of Mushroom Records, owned by Michael Gudinski. The single was initially released independently by No Records but was re-released in October 1982 following the band's signing with White Label Records.

They'd recorded "Spanish Blue" when the spectre of the Gudinski organisation loomed, and they were summoned to the Mushroom/White Citadel. Gudinski liked "Spanish Blue". 'It was just that he wanted us to re-write it, and re-mix it,' McComb laughs. 'We ended up putting it out ourselves immediately they started dilly dallying because we said we wouldn't re-mix it. We thought that we couldn't just wait for people to decide what they wanted to do.'

Track listing
All tracks written by David McComb.

 "Spanish Blue" - 2:12
 "Twisted Brain" - 4:02

Personnel
 David McComb - lead vocals, guitar
 Robert McComb - guitar, vocals, castanets
 Jill Yates - keyboards, tambourine
 Byron Sinclair - bass
 Alsy MacDonald - drums

References

1982 singles
The Triffids songs
Songs written by David McComb
1982 songs